Eugenia Geneva "Jean" Sutton  (July 5, 1917 – May 29, 2003) was an American science fiction author.

Life
Eugenia Geneva Hansen  was born on 5 July 1917. She married Jefferson Howard Sutton (1913–1979), with whom she wrote several science fiction novels for older children (juveniles). She wrote from 1950 till 1975, assisting her husband on several titles, and from 1967 was also named as coauthor.

Books (written 1965–1975)
The science fiction books were beloved by young teenagers; most however have been out of print since the early 1970s.

War - Novel about Marine's battle for the Matanikau River - Guadalcanal :
 The River, 1966 (a forgotten squad of marines battles at a river)

Teenage-Oriented (Juvenile) Science Fiction novels:
 The Beyond (people transcend to Small Magellanic Cloud)
 The Programmed Man (3 way spy novel with empire, telepaths, and breakaway star group)
 Lord of the Stars (orphan on planet circling an emerald Green sun defeats alien invasion)
 Alien From The Stars (alien crash lands on Earth)
 The Boy Who Had the Power (boy has memory crystal)

The Beyond (1967)
Plot Summary: An agent, sent to a distant planet where those with telepathic powers are banished, and ordered to find the person with the ability to move objects by thought, discovers to his horror that he is telepathic.

The Programmed Man (1968)
The reported power of the N-bomb aboard a destroyer spaceship preserves peace for years in the federated solar systems until enemy teleporters discover the bomb does not exist.

Lord of the Stars (1969)
Prologue: "Gultur, Lord of the Stars, knew his race was destined to conquer the Universe, for such was ordained when life first emerged from the slate-gray seas of Munga. He, himself, had decimated a score of worlds. But then, at the brink of his greatest victory, he encountered an alien youth who dwelt alone on the planet of an emerald sun."

The alien youth is an earth child named Danny who was catapulted to the planet Wenda by his parents before their spacecraft was destroyed. Danny and his no-form (for life take forms or no forms at all) Zandro are our heroes. Fine copy of a mind-stretching adventure penned by the husband-and-wife team that gave us The Beyond and The Programmed Man.

Alien from the Stars (1970)
The sole survivor of a space wreck is sought by a variety of earth agents whom he has little trouble eluding.

The Boy Who Had the Power (1971)
Plot Summary: A boy who has lost his memory is a herder on a remote planet until a mysterious man gives him a beautiful stone to help him remember. Published by Putnam Books.

References

Sources

External links
 
 Jefferson Sutton Science Fiction Collection, 1943–1985 

1917 births
2003 deaths
20th-century American novelists
American science fiction writers
American women novelists
Women science fiction and fantasy writers
People from Denmark, Wisconsin
Novelists from Wisconsin
20th-century American women writers
21st-century American women